Jhumur or Jhumar or Jhumair is a folk music of Sadanic language spoken by people of Chota Nagpur plateau, primarily in Jharkhand, southwestern region of West Bengal and northern part of Odisha. Also in the Tea State of Assam due to emigration. Jhumar songs are sung in various social events (i.e. primarily in Karam, Tusu, Bandna) by aboriginal communities like Kuṛmi, Oraon, Chik Baraik, Bagal, Bhumij, Rajwar, Munda.

Overview
The word Jhumar derived from Jhum (Shifting cultivation), which is a regional name of the primitive way of cultivation by aboriginals in eastern India and Bangladesh. In earlier period, it was a form of  shouting (locally known as Hawka/ Hanka) by working women in the form of short lines describing their emotions in the agriculture field. In the influence of Hinduism the song is colored with religious Gods like Radha Krishna, Rama Lakshmana. 

The Jhumar songs vary depending upon the region of singer as the Jhumar culture comprises a vast region of east india. So other dominant languages are intermixed with the song, making different dialectical songs. However, the Jhumar songs are primarily formatted in Nagpuri, Kurmali and Bengali language but as Non Ariyan tribal groups also observe the Jhumar associated festivals, So they sing in synthesized form of their native language and Nagpuri/Kurmali/Bengali language. In general, Jhumar songs are classified into two broad group i.e. Traditional Jhumar and Modified Jhumar. Some example of Traditional Jhumar are Adivasi Jhumur, Kathi Jhumur, Nachni Jhumur and Darbari, Pala, Dand are the examples of Modified Jhumar.

Adibasi, Bagalia, Baha, Bhaduria, Burihi, Chaitali, Dand, Darbari, Darsalia, Galoari, Jharkhandia, Jheta, Jhika, Jhikadang, Karam, Khatinach, Kurmali, Lagrey, Magha, Matoari, NachniNach, Pala, Pata, Raila, Riuja, Sadhu, Saharja, Tand, Thant and many more are the various disciplined Jhumar songs themed in Laukik Prem, Pouranik, Prahelika, Radha Krishna and Samajik.

Notable singer 
 Dulal Manki, Jhumair singer from Assam
 Indrani Mahato, Jhumar Singer from West Bengal
Mahavir Nayak, Theth Nagpuri singer

Reference

Further reading

Indian folk music
 
Traditional music